The item-total correlation test arises in psychometrics in contexts where a number of tests or questions are given to an individual and where the problem is to construct a useful single quantity for each individual that can be used to compare that individual with others in a given population. The test is used to see if any of the tests or questions ("items") do not have responses that vary in line with those for other tests across the population. The summary measure would be an average of some form, weighted where necessary, and the item-correlation test is used to decide whether or not responses to a given test should be included in the set being averaged. In some fields of application such a summary measure is called a scale.

The test
An item-total correlation test is performed to check if any item in the set of tests is inconsistent with the averaged behaviour of the others, and thus can be discarded. The analysis is performed to purify the measure by eliminating ‘garbage’ items prior to determining the factors that represent the construct; that is, the meaning of the averaged measure. 

It is supposed that the result for a particular test on a given individual is initially used to produce a score, where the scores for different tests have a similar range across individuals. An overall measure for an individual would be constructed as the average of the scores for a number of different tests. A check on whether a given test behaves similarly to the others is done by evaluating the Pearson correlation (across all individuals) between the scores for that test and the average of the scores of the remaining tests that are still candidates for inclusion in the measure. In a reliable measure, all items should correlate well with the average of the others. 

A small item-correlation provides empirical evidence that the item is not measuring the same construct measured by the other items included. A correlation value less than 0.2 or 0.3 indicates that the corresponding item does not correlate very well with the scale overall and, thus, it may be dropped.

See also
Scale analysis (statistics)

References 

Comparison of assessments
Covariance and correlation
Statistical tests
Statistical reliability